Mahmood Ahmad Khan is a Pakistani politician, belonging to Jamiat Ulema-e Islam (F), who was a member of the Provincial Assembly of Khyber Pakhtunkhwa from May 2013 to May 2018 and from August 2018 to January 2023. He also served as a member of different committees.

Political career
Khan was elected as the member of the Khyber Pakhtunkhwa Assembly on ticket of Jamiat Ulema-e Islam (F) from PK-69 (Tank) in 2013 Pakistani general election. He was re-elected in the 2018 General Elections on the ticket of Muttahida Majlis-e-Amal (a political alliance consisting of conservative, Islamist, religious, and far-right parties).

References

Living people
Pashtun people
Khyber Pakhtunkhwa MPAs 2013–2018
Jamiat Ulema-e-Islam (F) politicians
Muttahida Majlis-e-Amal MPAs (Khyber Pakhtunkhwa)
Year of birth missing (living people)